Alex Iván (born 26 March 1997) is a Slovak footballer who currently plays for Fortuna Liga club Spartak Trnava as a winger.

Club career

ŠKF Sereď
Iván made his Fortuna Liga debut for iClinic Sereď against Slovan Bratislava on 23 February 2019.

Honours
Spartak Trnava
Slovak Cup: 2021–22

References

External links
 
 
 Futbalnet profile 

1997 births
Living people
Sportspeople from Dunajská Streda
Slovak footballers
Association football midfielders
FC DAC 1904 Dunajská Streda players
FC Petržalka players
ŠKF Sereď players
Slovak Super Liga players
2. Liga (Slovakia) players
3. Liga (Slovakia) players